Peñaranda de Duero is a village and municipio located in the province of Burgos, Castile and León, Spain. According to the 2004 census (INE), the municipality has a population of 583 inhabitants.

The village is conserved as a conjunto histórico, a type of conservation area.  Several buildings are additionally protected as monuments.

Main sights
 Castle of Peñaranda de Duero (10th–15th century). 
 Palace of the Counts of Miranda (16th century).
 Jimeno's family pharmacy (17th century).
 Collegiate church of St. Anne.
 Justice pillar.

References

Municipalities in the Province of Burgos